The 2002 William Hill Greyhound Derby took place during May and June with the final being held on 1 June 2002 at Wimbledon Stadium. The winner received £75,000.

Final result 
At Wimbledon (over 480 metres):

Distances 
¾, 1, ¾, 2, ¾ (lengths)
The distances between the greyhounds are in finishing order and shown in lengths. One length is equal to 0.08 of one second.

Competition report

There were 173 entries for the 2002 Derby but one of the Britain's leading greyhounds Top Savings was lame and would miss the event, he had been quoted as a short 4-1 ante post favourite. Despite the loss of Top Savings trainer Charlie Lister and owner Ray White had brought Rapid Ranger out of retirement for an unprecedented third title attempt. 
The ante-post favourite was El Ronan at 12-1 followed by the Scottish Greyhound Derby first and second, Priceless Rebel and Santovita. In addition to Priceless Rebel trainer Paul Hennessy also sent over Irish Puppy Derby champion Rutland Budgie.

First round eliminations included Eclipse champion Bold Mossy and Rutland Budgie but Rapid Ranger won 22 and Santovita went fastest winning in 28.77 and entering the second round as the new favourite. The second round saw Rapid Ranger edge through after finishing third in his heat. Surprise eliminations included Santovita at odds of 1-4f, Vancouver Jet, Willie Go Fa, Occhi Gialli and Knockeevan King.

A third round heat contained Rapid Ranger, Priceless Rebel and Droopys Corleone and as the field rounded the second bend Priceless Rebel clipped the heels of the leader Rapid Ranger and fell impeding Rapid Ranger at the same time. Both were unfortunately knocked out and Rapid Ranger was retired to stud for a second time. In the quarter finals Droopys Corleone was victorious in 28.84 with Star Ambition, Blue Gooner and Pilot Alert taking the other three heats. Seskin Robert found trouble and went out.

The first semi-final resulted in Crack Him Out beating Pilot Alert and Call Me Baby and in the second Pall Mall Stakes champion Windgap Java defeated Allen Gift and Blue Gooner. Droopys Corleone failed to make the final after finishing fourth.

Rank outsider Allen Gift led all the way in the final challenged by call Me Baby from the third bend. Blue Gooner showed early pace and Crack Him Out moved wide at the first bend ending the chances of Pilot Alert and Windgap Java.

Quarter finals

Semi finals

See also
2002 UK & Ireland Greyhound Racing Year

References

Greyhound Derby
English Greyhound Derby